Samir Ayadi (Arabic: سمير أيادي), (1947-2008) was a Tunisian playwright.

Biography 
Born in Métouia, a village in southern Tunisia, his family moved to the capital Tunis when he was three years old. He studied at Khaznadar High School, where he graduated in 1966, then at the Faculty of Arts and Humanities of Tunis.

Literary and theatrical work 
Ayadi was a prolific writer for thirty-two years, including publishing several short stories including Sakhab Essamt, Kadhalika Yaktouloun el Amal, Zaman Ezzakharef and Hadir el Echq fel Ashar. He is also the author of a large number of plays including Ras El Ghoul, El Jazya El Hilaliya, Atchan ya Sabaya, Elissa (Dido), Sindbad, Sabra, A night in La Goulette, That Essour, Halawani Bab Souika or Mondo.

A founding member of the movement of the literary avant-garde in Tunis, he chaired the newspaper Culture, published by the literary club of the House of Culture Ibn-Khaldoun, the newspaper Al Massar, published by the Union of Tunisian Writers, and the newspaper La Vie culturelle, published at the time by the Ministry of Cultural Affairs. He also chaired the International Carthage Festival in the early 1980s.

Filmography

References

Tunisian writers
1947 births
2008 deaths
Tunisian male writers